Moth is the third and final full-length album by American indie band Chairlift, released in the United States via Columbia Records on January 22, 2016. The album art was created by NYC visual artist Rebecca Bird.

Critical reception

Before being released, Consequence of Sound, Pitchfork, Stereogum, and Billboard included Moth in their lists of most anticipated albums of 2016, and it has received generally favorable reviews. Brooklyn Magazine named the album its "Album of the Month" for January 2016.

Moth received mostly positive reviews from contemporary music critics. At Metacritic, which assigns a normalized rating out of 100 to reviews from mainstream critics, the album received an average score of 73, based on 21 reviews,which indicates "generally favorable reviews". Writing for Allmusic, Tim Sendra characterized Moth as "an album that amplifies the pop aspects of Something and blows it out into a sometimes brilliant listening experience." In a positive review for Exclaim!, Stephen Carlick wrote that "with Moth, Chairlift make a strong claim to being one of pop music's best songwriting teams, with the production and vocal chops to bring their compositions fully and vibrantly to life." Rolling Stone praised the album as "a record where love, music and love for music come together beautifully."

Track listing

Notes
  signifies an additional producer.

Personnel
Chairlift
 Caroline Polachek – vocals (all tracks), synthesizer (1–3, 5–10), bass (2, 4, 5, 7), bongos (2, 7), drums (2, 4, 7); horn, shaker (2); castanets, violin (6); engineering, percussion (7); piano (8), oboe, snare drum (9)
 Patrick Wimberly – engineering (all tracks); drums (1–4, 8, 10), guitar (1, 2, 5, 8, 9), marimba (1), horn (2, 4, 10), percussion (2, 7–9), synthesizer (2–10), vocals (2–4), acoustic guitar (3), bass (4–6, 9); autoharp, cymbals (7); programming (7, 8, 10)

Additional musicians
 Danny Meyer – saxophone (1, 2, 4, 8, 10)
 David Ginyard – bass (2, 8, 10)
 Joey Postiglione – guitar (2, 5), synthesizer (10)
 Kurt Feldman – guitar (2, 10)
 John Lake – trumpet (2)
 Miles B.A. Robinson – speaker (3)
 Robin Hannibal – bass (4), drums (4, 7, 8); keyboards, percussion (4, 8)
 Juri Onuki – speaker (6)
 Emily Holden – violin (6)
 Joel Van Dijk – guitar (7, 8)
 Dustin Schletzer – snare drum (9)

Technical
 Chris Gehringer – mastering
 Jaycen Joshua – mixing (1, 3, 4, 6, 8)
 Mick Guzauski – mixing (2, 7, 9, 10)
 Tom Elmhirst – mixing (5)
 Jake Aron – engineering
 Miles B.A. Robinson – engineering
 Yale Yng-Wong – engineering
 Rob Cohen – engineering (4, 7, 8)
 Maddox Chhim – engineering assistance (1, 3, 4, 6, 8)
 Ryan Kaul – engineering assistance (1, 3, 4, 6, 8)
 Chad Wilson – engineering assistance (4, 8)
 Joe Visciano – engineering assistance (5)

Charts

References

2016 albums
Albums produced by Caroline Polachek
Albums produced by Patrick Wimberly
Chairlift (band) albums
Columbia Records albums